Rowland House may refer to:

John A. Rowland House, Industry, California, listed on the NRHP in California
Henry August Rowland House, Baltimore, Maryland, listed on the NRHP in Maryland
Alfred Rowland House, Lumberton, North Carolina, listed on the NRHP in North Carolina 
Rowland House (Cheltenham, Pennsylvania), listed on the NRHP in Pennsylvania

See also
Rowland Site, Greenwood MS, listed on the NRHP in Mississippi